Iseline Crivelli (4 January 1903 – 30 May 1988) was an Italian alpine skier. She competed in the women's combined event at the 1936 Winter Olympics.

References

External links
 

1903 births
1988 deaths
Italian female alpine skiers
Olympic alpine skiers of Italy
Alpine skiers at the 1936 Winter Olympics
Alpine skiers from Milan